The Elitserien was the top level ice hockey league in Sweden from 1927–1935. It existed alongside the Swedish Championship, where the national champion was crowned. It was replaced by Svenska Serien in the 1935–36 season.

Champions

External links
List of champions on hockeyarchives.info

 
1
1927 establishments in Sweden
1935 disestablishments in Sweden